Duns railway station served the town of Duns, Scottish Borders, Scotland from 1849 to 1951 on the Berwickshire Railway.

History 
The station opened on 13 August 1849 as Dunse station by the North British Railway. The name was changed to Duns in May 1883. The building on the up platform shared a building with the wooden goods shed. The St Boswells-Duns portion of the line closed due to flooding on 13 August 1948. The station was closed for passengers on 10 September 1951.

References

External links 

Disused railway stations in the Scottish Borders
Former North British Railway stations
Railway stations in Great Britain opened in 1849
Railway stations in Great Britain closed in 1951
Duns, Scottish Borders